Gibberula sueziensis is a species of sea snail, a marine gastropod mollusk, in the family Cystiscidae.

Description
The length of the shell attains .

Distribution
This marine species occurs in Egyptian part of the Red Sea.

References

 Savigny, J-.C., 1817 Description de l'Egypte, ou recueil des observations et des recherches qui ont été faites en Egypte pendant l'expédition de l'Armée française, publié par les ordres de sa Majesté l'Empereur Napoléon le Grand. Histoire Naturelle, p. 339 pp
 Issel, A., 1869 - Malacologia del mar rosso. Ricerche zoologiche e paleontologiche, p. 387 pp, pls 1-5
 Boyer F. (2017). Révision des marginelles d'Issel et description de trois Gibberula nouvelles des côtes égyptiennes de la Mer Rouge. Xenophora Taxonomy. 16: 9-24.

sueziensis
Gastropods described in 1869